El Capitan is a layered rock outcrop found within the Margaritifer Sinus quadrangle (MC-19) region of the planet Mars, this geological outcrop was first discovered and observed by the Mars Exploration Rover Opportunity in February 2004. The rock outcrop was named for El Capitan, a topographical mountain lying within the state, Texas.

See also
List of rocks on Mars
Eagle (crater)
List of surface features of Mars imaged by Opportunity

External links 
Nasa's Mars Exploration Program

Rocks on Mars
Margaritifer Sinus quadrangle